The Apollo Comedy Hour is a sketch-comedy that aired in first-run syndication from 1992-1995. The series was filmed the legendary Apollo Theater in Harlem, New York. It was produced by the same people who produced It's Showtime at the Apollo.

Format
Like a similar syndicated show from around the same time period, Uptown Comedy Club and the Fox series In Living Color, Apollo Comedy Hour featured a cast of young hopeful comedians, guest stars and a new musical act for each episode.

Cast
The cast was primarily black and Hispanic, with sketches primarily written around their personal experiences and observations. Series regulars included Paula Jai Parker, Grace Garland, Lisa Nicole Carson, Debra Wilson, and Ian Edwards. Randl Ask and later Ilan Kwittken were the only white cast members. The show was hosted by Phyllis Stickney. Mary Flowers served as music talent executive.

Meanwhile, Patrice O'Neal's first television appearance was on The Apollo Comedy Hour. Other performers featured included Derrick Fox, Yusuf Lamont, Kool Bubba Ice, Gil T, A.G. White, Deirdre Boddie-Henderson, Mike Yard, John Henton, Charles Walden, Damon Rozier, Freddie Ricks, Darryl Littleton, Daran Howard, Tony Woods, and Alonzo Bodden.

Stations

References

External links
 

1992 American television series debuts
1995 American television series endings
1990s American black television series
1990s American sketch comedy television series
1990s American stand-up comedy television series
1990s American variety television series
First-run syndicated television programs in the United States
Hip hop television
English-language television shows
Television series by Tribune Entertainment